Timmins is a city in the Canadian province of Ontario.

Timmins may also refer to:

Timmins (surname)
Timmins (electoral district), a defunct Ontario federal election district
Timmins (provincial electoral district) a current Ontario Provincial election district.
HMCS Timmins (K223), a Flower-class corvette of the Royal Canadian Navy